Natsamrāt (roughly translated as: The King of Theater or The Emperor of Actors) is a 2018 Indian Gujarati-language drama film starring Siddharth Randeria and Deepika Chikhalia in the leading role. The film is the remake of Marathi film of the same name starring Nana Patekar, which was based on Marathi play by V. V. Shirwadkar. Before making it to the big screen as movie, Randeria has adopted the screen play to a Gujarati language stage play named 'Amari Duniya, Tamari Duniya' in 2007 with many known faces of Gujarati theatre like Randeria himhelf, Jimmit trivedi, Disha Savla-Upadhyay etc. The film is the story of an actor who has reached many heights in his career, but has to retire from acting at the peak.

Cast
 Siddharth Randeria as Harindra Pathak
 Deepika Chikhalia as Mangala Pathak
 Manoj Joshi as Madhav
 Samvedna Suwalka as Neha
 Tasneem Sheikh as Jigna
 Hemang Vyas  as Makrand

Release
This film was released in theatres on 30 August 2018.

Reception
The Times of India gave this movie 4 out of 5 stars.

See also
Natsamrat (Marathi)

References

External links
 

Films shot in Gujarat
2018 drama films
Gujarati remakes of Marathi films
Indian drama films
2010s Gujarati-language films